André Blavier (23 October 1922 – 12 June 2001) was a Belgian poet. From 1961 he was a member of the literary group Oulipo and served as their foreign correspondent. 

He was born in Verviers into a working-class family. His wife was the collage artist and translator Odette Blavier. 

Blavier was greatly influenced by the work of Raymond Queneau, and became a member of Oulipo (the name is a contraction for Ouvroir de littérature potentielle or "workshop of potential literature"), a group consisting of mostly French-speaking writers and mathematicians who create literary works using constrained writing techniques.

References

Pataphysicians
1922 births
2001 deaths
Belgian male poets
Belgian poets in French
People from Verviers
Walloon movement activists
Walloon people
20th-century Belgian poets
20th-century Belgian male writers
Oulipo members